The 1984 Cincinnati Bearcats football team represented the University of Cincinnati during the 1984 NCAA Division I-A football season. The Bearcats, led by first-year head coach Dave Currey, participated as independent and played their home games at Riverfront Stadium.  On-Campus Nippert Stadium was used as a supplement.

Schedule

References

Cincinnati
Cincinnati Bearcats football seasons
Cincinnati Bearcats football